The Reformed Church is a church in Cehu Silvaniei, Romania, rebuilt up until 1604.

References

External links
 Cehu Silvaniei, Reformed church

Cehu Silvaniei
Reformed churches in Romania
Historic monuments in Sălaj County
Churches completed in 1604
Churches in Sălaj County
1604 establishments in Europe
17th-century establishments in Romania